Principles of Philosophy is a book by René Descartes. In essence, it is a synthesis of the Discourse on Method and Meditations on First Philosophy. It was written in Latin, published in 1644 and dedicated to Elisabeth of Bohemia, with whom Descartes had a long-standing friendship. A French version (Les Principes de la Philosophie) followed in 1647.

The book sets forth the principles of nature—the Laws of Physics—as Descartes viewed them. Most notably, it set forth the principle that in the absence of external forces, an object's motion will be uniform and in a straight line. Newton borrowed this principle from Descartes and included it in his own Principia; to this day, it is still generally referred to as Newton's First Law of Motion. The book was primarily intended to replace the Aristotelian curriculum then used in French and British universities. The work provides a systematic statement of his metaphysics and natural philosophy, and represents the first truly comprehensive, mechanistic account of the universe.

Preface to the French edition 
Descartes asked Abbot Claude Picot to translate his Latin Principia Philosophiae into French. For this edition, he wrote a preface disguised as a letter to the translator, whose title is "Letter of the author to the translator of the book, that may be used as a preface." This was published in 1647, a date already in the mature, final period of his life. In this writing, Descartes pours some reflexions about his idea of wisdom and philosophy. Its content may be summarized as follows.

Concept of philosophy 
Philosophy is the study of wisdom, understood as the ability to conduct the human activities; and also as the perfect knowledge of all the things that a man can know for the direction of his life, maintenance of his health, and knowledge of the arts. Only God is perfectly wise, and the man is more or less wise, in proportion to the knowledge he has of the most important truths.

The degrees of knowledge 
Descartes identifies four degrees of knowledge, he names common, and a fifth one he designates as higher. The first degree consists on clear and evident notions that can be acquired without need of any meditation. The second degree is all that is learned by means of the senses. The third comprises what we learn when talking with other men. The fourth consists on what we can learn from the writings of men capable of giving good instructions.

Higher wisdom 
There have been great men in all times that have sought after a better and more secure wisdom, a fifth degree of knowledge. This has consisted on the search for the first causes, and those that have followed this pursuit have been named philosophers, but he thinks that no one has been successful yet.

Doubt and certainty 
Since Plato and Aristotle, there has been a discussion about doubt and certainty. Those that have favored doubt have arrived to extremes of doubting even the most evident things, and those that have sought certainty have relied excessively on the senses. Though it is true that it has been accepted that the senses may mislead us, according to Descartes, nobody had yet expressed that the truth can not be based on the senses, but in the understanding, when it is founded on evident perceptions.

Meditations on first philosophy 
The search for the first causes, or basic truths, as undertaken by Descartes is contained in this work. It explains the metaphysical principles on which to build the rest of knowledge.

The tree of philosophy 
The philosophy is like a tree, whose roots are the metaphysics, its trunk the physics, and the branches the rest of sciences, mainly medicine, mechanics, and morals that is the last level of wisdom. In the same way that the tree has its fruits in its outer parts, the usefulness of philosophy is also contained in the parts that are learnt at the end.

Copies and modern editions 

A copy of Descartes' Principia philosophiae dated 1656 is owned by the Tom Slick rare book collection at the Southwest Research Institute in Texas.

Reidel, a Dutch publisher, released an English edition of Principia philosophiae in 1983, translated by Valentine Rodger and Reese P. Miller with explanatory notes. Though a translation of the original 1644 Latin work, this edition by Rodger and Miller includes additional material from the 1647 French translation.

See also 
 Bucket argument
 Conservation of momentum

Related works
 The World (Descartes)
 Principia philosophiae cartesianae by Baruch Spinoza

References

External links 

Descartes' 1644 Principia philosophiae (free Google eBook)
Selections from the Principles of Philosophy at Project Gutenberg
Principles of Philosophy, modified for easier reading
Principia philosophiae. Amstelodami, apud Ludovicum Elzevirium, 1644. From the Rare Book and Special Collections Division at the Library of Congress

1644 books
Physics books
Works by René Descartes
Natural philosophy
17th-century Latin books